Buvaisar Hamidovich Saitiev, also spelled Buvaysar Hamidovich Saytiev, (born March 11, 1975, in Khasavyurt, Dagestan ASSR) is a Russian retired freestyle wrestler of Chechen heritage, who represented Russia, and won nine world-level gold medals in freestyle wrestling (second most, behind Aleksandr Medved's ten). He is widely considered as the greatest freestyle wrestler of all time. He currently is an acting State Duma Deputy from Dagestan.

Life
In 1992, Buvaisar left his hometown of Khasavyurt, Dagestan in order to train at a prestigious wrestling center in Krasnoyarsk, Siberia. His younger brother Adam Saitiev would follow in his footsteps.

Soon after graduating from the training center, Saitiev began his quest to represent Russia on the world stage. Buvaisar has been decorated with the Order of Friendship by the Russian president. His younger brother Adam Saitiev, also a wrestler, won gold in the 2000 Summer Olympics in Sydney.

Buvaisar's life philosophy has been heavily influenced by Nobel Prize-winning poet Boris Pasternak. Saitiev repeats Pasternak's poem, "It is not seemly to be famous," before every match, and according to Buvaisar, the poem has defined his life both inside and outside of wrestling.

Wrestling career
Saitiev has won nine world-level gold medals. He is a six-time world champion and a three-time Olympic champion. His senior-level international career began in 1994 and, to date, has continued on through the 2008 Olympics in Beijing, China. In thirteen years, he's entered eleven world championship tournaments, won nine world championship tournaments, and lost only two bouts.
In 1994, Buvaisar lost to Iranian technical wrestler  Davood Ghanbari at the World Wrestling Championships at the age of 18
In 1999, Buvaisar did not wrestle at the world championships. Instead his weight class was represented by his younger brother Adam, who won a gold medal. Saitiev also did not compete at the world championships in 2002. He lost to Magomed Isagadjiev at the 2002 Russian Nationals. Isagadjiev went on the win a silver medal at the world championships. In 2007 Saitiev was beat out for the Russian team by Makhach Murtazaliev, who went on to win the world title. According to media reports, Saitiev's training in 2007 was hampered by a neck injury.

Match results

! colspan="7"| World Championships & Olympics
|-
!  Res.
!  Record
!  Opponent
!  Score
!  Date
!  Event
!  Location
|-
! style=background:white colspan=7 |
|-
|Win
|46-2
|align=left| Soslan Tigiev
|style="font-size:88%"|0–1, 1–0, 3–1
|style="font-size:88%" rowspan=5|August 12, 2008
|style="font-size:88%" rowspan=5|2008 Olympic Games
|style="text-align:left;font-size:88%;" rowspan=5| Beijing, China
|-
|Win
|45-2
|align=left| Kiril Terziev
|style="font-size:88%"|Fall
|-
|Win
|44-2
|align=left| Ivan Fundora
|style="font-size:88%"|2-0, 2-1
|-
|Win
|43-2
|align=left| Ahmet Gülhan
|style="font-size:88%"|1-0, 4-0
|-
|Win
|42-2
|align=left| Cho Byung-kwan
|style="font-size:88%"|1-0, 7-2
|-
! style=background:white colspan=7 |
|-
|Loss
|41-2
|align=left| Mihail Ganev
|style="font-size:88%"|3-0, 2-2, 1-1
|style="font-size:88%" rowspan=3|September 27, 2006
|style="font-size:88%" rowspan=3|2006 World Wrestling Championships
|style="text-align:left;font-size:88%;" rowspan=3| Guangzhou, China
|-
|Win
|41-1
|align=left| Ivan Fundora
|style="font-size:88%"|5-3, 7-2
|-
|Win
|40-1
|align=left| Maximo Blanco
|style="font-size:88%"|4-1, 5-0
|-
! style=background:white colspan=7 |
|-
|Win
|39-1
|align=left| Arpad Ritter
|style="font-size:88%"|3-0, 3-1
|style="font-size:88%" rowspan=5|September 26, 2005
|style="font-size:88%" rowspan=5|2005 World Wrestling Championships
|style="text-align:left;font-size:88%;" rowspan=5| Budapest, Hungary
|-
|Win
|38-1
|align=left| Mehdi Hajizadeh
|style="font-size:88%"|6-0, 5-3
|-
|Win
|37-1
|align=left| Salvatore Rinella
|style="font-size:88%"|6-1, 5-0
|-
|Win
|36-1
|align=left| Nikolay Paslar
|style="font-size:88%"|3-0, 3-1
|-
|Win
|35-1
|align=left| Malak Mohamed Osman
|style="font-size:88%"|2-0, 9-0
|-
! style=background:white colspan=7 |
|-
|Win
|34-1
|align=left| Gennadiy Laliyev
|style="font-size:88%"|7-0
|style="font-size:88%" rowspan=5|August 26, 2004
|style="font-size:88%" rowspan=5|2004 Olympic Games
|style="text-align:left;font-size:88%;" rowspan=5| Athens, Greece
|-
|Win
|33-1
|align=left| Krystian Brzozowski
|style="font-size:88%"|8-0
|-
|Win
|32-1
|align=left| Murad Gaidarov
|style="font-size:88%"|3-2
|-
|Win
|31-1
|align=left| Emzarios Bentinidis
|style="font-size:88%"|6-1
|-
|Win
|30-1
|align=left| Arpad Ritter
|style="font-size:88%"|8-2
|-
! style=background:white colspan=7 |
|-
|Win
|29-1
|align=left| Murad Gaidarov
|style="font-size:88%"|2-2
|style="font-size:88%" rowspan=5|September 12, 2003
|style="font-size:88%" rowspan=5|2003 World Wrestling Championships
|style="text-align:left;font-size:88%;" rowspan=5| New York City, United States
|-
|Win
|28-1
|align=left| Hadi Habibi
|style="font-size:88%"|6-3
|-
|Win
|27-1
|align=left| Talgat Ilyasov
|style="font-size:88%"|9-1
|-
|Win
|26-1
|align=left| Nikolay Paslar
|style="font-size:88%"|4-1
|-
|Win
|25-1
|align=left| Jean Bernard Diatta
|style="font-size:88%"|Tech. Fall
|-
! style=background:white colspan=7 |
|-
|Win
|24-1
|align=left| Moon Eui-jae
|style="font-size:88%"|3-2
|style="font-size:88%" rowspan=5|November 22, 2001
|style="font-size:88%" rowspan=5|2001 World Wrestling Championships
|style="text-align:left;font-size:88%;" rowspan=5| Sofia, Bulgaria
|-
|Win
|23-1
|align=left| Joe Williams
|style="font-size:88%"|5-4
|-
|Win
|22-1
|align=left| Revaz Mindorashvili
|style="font-size:88%"|3-2
|-
|Win
|21-1
|align=left| Kunihiko Obata
|style="font-size:88%"|7-0
|-
|Win
|20-1
|align=left| Ruslan Khinchagov
|style="font-size:88%"|4-3
|-
! style=background:white colspan=7 |
|-
|Loss
|19-1
|align=left| Brandon Slay
|style="font-size:88%"|3-4
|style="font-size:88%" rowspan=2|September 28, 2000
|style="font-size:88%" rowspan=2|2000 Olympic Games
|style="text-align:left;font-size:88%;" rowspan=2| Sydney, Australia
|-
|Win
|19-0
|align=left| Plamen Paskalev
|style="font-size:88%"|8-2
|-
! style=background:white colspan=7 |
|-
|Win
|18-0
|align=left| Moon Eui-jae
|style="font-size:88%"|3-0
|style="font-size:88%" rowspan=4|September 7, 1998
|style="font-size:88%" rowspan=4|1998 World Wrestling Championships
|style="text-align:left;font-size:88%;" rowspan=4| Tehran, Iran
|-
|Win
|17-0
|align=left| Marcin Jurecki
|style="font-size:88%"|Fall
|-
|Win
|16-0
|align=left| Alexander Kahniasvili
|style="font-size:88%"|Tech. Fall
|-
|Win
|15-0
|align=left| Victor Peikov
|style="font-size:88%"|Tech. Fall
|-
! style=background:white colspan=7 |
|-
|Win
|14-0
|align=left| Alexander Leipold
|style="font-size:88%"|3-1
|style="font-size:88%" rowspan=5|August 29, 1997
|style="font-size:88%" rowspan=5|1997 World Wrestling Championships
|style="text-align:left;font-size:88%;" rowspan=5| Krasnojarsk, Russia
|-
|Win
|13-0
|align=left| Moon Eui-jae
|style="font-size:88%"|6-2
|-
|Win
|12-0
|align=left| David Bichinashvili
|style="font-size:88%"|7-0
|-
|Win
|11-0
|align=left| Arpad Ritter
|style="font-size:88%"|6-0
|-
|Win
|10-0
|align=left| Nicholas Ugoalah
|style="font-size:88%"|Fall
|-
! style=background:white colspan=7 |
|-
|Win
|9-0
|align=left| Park Jang-soon
|style="font-size:88%"|5-0
|style="font-size:88%" rowspan=4|July 30, 1996
|style="font-size:88%" rowspan=4|1996 Olympic Games
|style="text-align:left;font-size:88%;" rowspan=4| Atlanta, United States
|-
|Win
|8-0
|align=left| Kenny Monday
|style="font-size:88%"|6-1
|-
|Win
|7-0
|align=left| Alexander Leipold
|style="font-size:88%"|3-1
|-
|Win
|6-0
|align=left| Issa Momeni
|style="font-size:88%"|8-0
|-
! style=background:white colspan=7 |
|-
|Win
|5-0
|align=left| Alexander Leipold
|style="font-size:88%"|3-2
|style="font-size:88%" rowspan=5|August 10, 1995
|style="font-size:88%" rowspan=5|1995 World Wrestling Championships
|style="text-align:left;font-size:88%;" rowspan=5| Atlanta, United States
|-
|Win
|4-0
|align=left| Magomed Salam Gadshiev
|style="font-size:88%"|3-0
|-
|Win
|3-0
|align=left| Victor Peikov
|style="font-size:88%"|12-3
|-
|Win
|2-0
|align=left| Krzysztof Walencik
|style="font-size:88%"|Fall
|-
|Win
|1-0
|align=left| Alberto Rodríguez
|style="font-size:88%"|Tech. Fall
|-

References

External links
 
 CHECHEN FIGHT CLUB
 Buvaysar's official website
 JISS Olympic Result Database information
 Chechnya Free.ru article
 Interview with Buvaisar Saitiev (in Russian)
Flowrestling Video Interview with Saitiev after 2008 Olympics

1975 births
Chechen martial artists
Living people
Olympic gold medalists for Russia
Wrestlers at the 1996 Summer Olympics
Wrestlers at the 2000 Summer Olympics
Russian male sport wrestlers
Wrestlers at the 2004 Summer Olympics
Wrestlers at the 2008 Summer Olympics
Olympic wrestlers of Russia
People from Khasavyurt
Olympic medalists in wrestling
Russian people of Chechen descent
Chechen sportsmen
Medalists at the 2008 Summer Olympics
Medalists at the 2004 Summer Olympics
World Wrestling Championships medalists
Medalists at the 1996 Summer Olympics
Seventh convocation members of the State Duma (Russian Federation)
21st-century Russian politicians
European Wrestling Championships medalists